Campbell Chapel African Methodist Episcopal Church is a historic church in Pulaski, Tennessee.

It was built in 1925. It was added to the National Register of Historic Places in 2000. Its National Register listing recognized its Gothic Revival architectural style and the "exceptional craftsmanship of its stone masonry".

References

African Methodist Episcopal churches in Tennessee
Churches on the National Register of Historic Places in Tennessee
Gothic Revival church buildings in Tennessee
Churches completed in 1925
20th-century Methodist church buildings in the United States
Churches in Giles County, Tennessee
National Register of Historic Places in Giles County, Tennessee